Fort Jennings High School is a public high school in Fort Jennings, Ohio.   It is a member of Putnam County.  It is the only high school in the Jennings Local Schools district.  Their mascot is the Musketeers.  They are a member of the Putnam County League.   The superintendent of the school district is Nick Langhals, and the dean of students is Todd Hoehn.  They built a new high school in 2004.  Their building is connected to their elementary school.

Ohio High School Athletic Association State Championships

Boys Basketball – 2000

Soccer Association for Youth State Championships
Boys Soccer - 1995, 1997

References

External links
 District Website

High schools in Putnam County, Ohio
Public high schools in Ohio